Clwyd South may refer to:

 Clwyd South (UK Parliament constituency)
 Clwyd South (Senedd constituency)